Ismail Khan was a nobleman of the Sultanate of Bengal. He was the brother of Isa Khan, the leader of the Baro-Bhuiyan confederacy.

Biography
Khan was born in the 16th-century into an aristocratic Bengali Sunni Muslim zamindar family known as the Dewans of Sarail in the Sultanate of Bengal. His grandfather, Dewan Bhagirath, belonged to a Bais Rajput clan from Ayodhya and settled in Sarail after being appointed as the Dewan of Sultan Ghiyasuddin Mahmud Shah of Bengal. His father, Dewan Sulaiman Khan (formerly Kalidas Gazdani), inherited this position and converted to Sunni Islam. Ismail Khan's mother, Syeda Momena Khatun, was the daughter of Sultan Mahmud Shah. His maternal aunt was married to Khidr Khan Surak. Ismail had one brother, Masnad-i-Ali Isa Khan, who would later rule Bengal and one sister, Shahinsha Bibi.

Khan's maternal grandfather, Sultan Mahmud Shah of Bengal, was defeated by the Afghan sultan Sher Shah in 1538, leading to Bengal becoming a province of the Sur Empire. During the reign of Islam Shah Suri in 1545, Muhammad Khan Sur was appointed as the Governor of Bengal and responsible for warding off rebellious chieftains in the region. The Dewans of Sarail were one of the most notable resistances to Sur authority, and Ismail's father was given the death penalty. A force led by Taj Khan and Dariya Khan were dispatched against them, and despite a strong resistance from the Dewans, Ismail's father Sulaiman was eventually killed in the conflict. Ismail, and his elder brother Isa Khan, were subsequently taken as captives and later sold as slaves to Iranian traders in Turan.

In 1563, the Karrani dynasty took control of Bengal and Bihar. Ismail's uncle, Dewan Qutbuddin Khan, was employed in the court of Sultan Taj Khan Karrani and successfully traced his nephews. Qutbuddin Khan managed to free Ismail and his brother by exchanging currency with their owners.

See also
 History of Bangladesh

References

16th-century births
16th-century deaths
16th-century men
16th-century Bengalis
16th-century Indian Muslims
Bengali Muslims
Sunni Muslims
People from Sarail Upazila
Freedmen